John Boaden (1792/93 – 4 April 1839) was an English portrait painter.

Life
Boaden was the son of the theatre critic James Boaden. A painter of portraits and theatrical subjects, he exhibited 40 works at the Royal Academy between 1810 and 1833, 90 at the British Institute between 1810 and 1839, and 59 at the Society of British Artists between 1827 and 1840 (in the last year posthumously).

Just six weeks after his father's death, Boaden died of "apoplexy" in London, aged 46.

External links
 , a painting engraved by C. Marr for The Amulet annual, 1836, with a poetical illustration by Letitia Elizabeth Landon

References

Attribution:
 

1790s births
1839 deaths
19th-century English painters
English male painters
English portrait painters
Year of birth uncertain
Burials at Kensal Green Cemetery
19th-century English male artists